Allan Dawson Boardman was a British physicist, known for his work on surface plasmons and guided wave optics, especially nonlinear waves, solitons, magneto-optics and negative refracting metamaterials.  He was a theorist and numerical analyst in these areas, especially magneto-optics and metamaterials. In 2006 he was made a fellow of the Optical Society of America for his contributions in these fields and for "exemplary leadership and service to the optics community".

Boardman made substantial contributions to his university, leading the School of Sciences. Latterly, he was a Professorial Research Fellow at the University of Salford. He held a Doctor of Science degree from the University of Durham. He was a Fellow of the UK Institute of Physics and a Fellow of the UK Institute of Mathematics and its Applications. He was the conference chair for the major UK photonics meeting called Photon10. He was a Fellow of the SPIE and co-chair of the SPIE Photonic Metamaterials conference series to be held in San Diego in 2014. He had also organized other conferences, including being a director of a number of pivotal NATO Advanced Study Institutes.

He was the chair of the Optics and Photonics Division of the UK Institute of Physics and the vice-president of the United Kingdom Consortium for Optics and Photonics (UKCPO).  He had served as a board member of the Quantum Electronics and Optics Division of the European Physical Society. He was the UK voice on the new European strategy program called OPERA [Optics and Photonics in the European Research Area] 2015.

Boardman was honoured with a special session in his name at the 3rd International Conference on Metamaterials, Photonic Crystals and Plasmonics (Meta '12) in Paris in 2012. He presented nearly 300 conference papers and had been editor for several books, such as 'Soliton-driven Photonics' https://www.amazon.com/Soliton-driven-Photonics-Nato-Science-II/dp/0792371313/ .

Boardman died on 24 November 2018.

Selected publications
A. D. Boardman (editor and contributor on surface plasmons), "Electromagnetic Surface Modes", John Wiley (1982).

References

External links
 Physics Department at the University of Salford.
 Faculty page, University of Salford
 Journal of the Optical Society of America B: Editorial board
 In memory of Professor Allan Boardman University of Salford news item.

British physicists
Academics of the University of Salford
Fellows of the Institute of Physics
Fellows of the Institute of Mathematics and its Applications
1937 births
2018 deaths
Alumni of King's College, Newcastle
Scientists from Northumberland